Izé Teixeira or Izé (born 1974) is a singer currently living in France.

Biography
Izé Teixeira was born on the island of Santiago. In his childhood or his teenage years, he immigrated to France and lived in the Paris Metropolitan Area.

His first release was a maxi in 2000 titled Ma volonté. He later released Double Nationalidade (2001), which was his first studio album, Mobilizé (2003), and Kunana Spirit. Izé Teixeira released his fourth album Urb/Africa in February 2011, featuring Capeverdean music and colorful melodies.  Izé was one of the members of La MC Malcriado band, a collection of Cape Verdean singers including Stomy Bugsy, Jacky Brown, and others including Neg'Marrons and JP in two fingers.

Nominations
Izé received two nominations with the group MC Malcriado. "Dis l'Heure 2 Zouk" was nominated at Victoires de la musique (Music of the Winners) 2004 under the category Best Reggae/Ragga Album of the Year and a trophy for Best Group of the African Diaspora at the 2010 Kora Awards.

Discography

Mazi
Ma volonté (2000)

Solo albums
Double Nationalité (2001)
 Mobilizé  (2003)
 Kunana Spirit (2007)
 Urb'Africa (2011)

with La MC Malcriado
"Nos Pobreza Ké Nos Rikeza" (2006)
"Fidju di kriolu" (2011)

Features and compilations
Le calibre qu’il te faut, (1996), album by Stomy Bugsy
Cap Sol (2002)
4ème Round (2003), album by Stomy Bugsy
Dis l'heure 2 Zouk (2003)
Autour du Monde Cap-Vert (2006) - compilation
Cabo Dream (Vol.1) (2006) - compilation
Latina Fever /vol.2 (2007) - compilation
African Fever (2008) - compilation
Un geste pour Haïti (2010)
Yes we can songs about leaving africa (2010) - compilation for the 2010 World Cup
Revolucion Karibeana (2010), album by Victor O
En (2010), reggae dancehall style
Sound of secousse vol.1 (2010)

References

External links
 
Izé Teixeira at Myspace
 http://www.conseilfrancophone.org/fr_FR/news/detail/id/201

1974 births
Living people
21st-century Cape Verdean male singers
Cape Verdean expatriates in France
People from Santiago, Cape Verde
21st-century French male singers